Bandar Seri Botani (Jawi: بندر سري بوتاني) is a new township in Ipoh, Perak, Malaysia. It is located between Batu Gajah and Simpang Pulai.

References

External links
 

Populated places in Perak
Ipoh